Rosalind Hauk Kornfeld (1935–2007) was a scientist at Washington University in St. Louis known for her research determining the structure and formation of oligosaccharides. The Society of Glycobiology annually awards a lifetime achievement award in her honor.

Education and career 
Rosalind Kornfeld  Hauk was born in Dallas, Texas and then grew up in Chevy Chase, Maryland. She earned a bachelor of science degree from George Washington University in 1957. She went on to receive her Ph.D. degree in 1961 working on enzymes in rabbit muscles. For a brief period she stayed at George Washington University as a postdoctoral investigator before moving to the National Institutes of Health as a fellow working with Victor Ginsburg. She moved back to St. Louis in 1965 when she accepted a position at Washington University in St. Louis. She started as a research instructor, was promoted to research assistant professor in 1971, and then research associate professor in 1978. In 1981 she was named a professor of medicine and professor of biochemistry and molecular biophysics. Kornfeld retired in 2001.

Kornfeld founded the Academic Women's Network at Washington University and then served as its first president. She also served as president of the Society of Glycobiology in 1993.

Research 
Kornfeld's research laid the groundwork for the field of glycobiology with her investigations into nucleotide sugar biosynthesis and glycan ligands for lectins. Korneld's notable accomplishments include defining the structure and function of N-acetylglucosamine-1-phosphodiester alpha-N-acetylglucosaminidase, commonly known as the 'uncovering enzyme' or UCE. She then worked to place that enzyme within the trans Golgi network. Kornfeld wrote two influential reviews on oligosaccharides, the second of which has been cited over 6000 times as of 2021.

Selected publications

Awards and honors 
Starting in 2007, the Academic Women's Network at Washington University has awarded the Rosalind Kornfeld Lecture for Distinguished Women in Science. Since 2008, the Society for Glycobiology has awarded the Rosalind Kornfeld Lifetime Achievement Award to honor accomplishments in research within the field. The second edition of Essentials in Glycobiology is dedicated to Rosalind Kornfeld and Roger W. Jeanloz, who are noted as "pioneers in the elucidation of glycan structure and function".

Personal life 
Her husband was Stuart Kornfeld whom she met when she was a first year graduate student in biochemistry in 1958. They married in 1959 and worked together for 48 years; during his speech accepting the 2010 George M. Kober medal he acknowledged the key role she played in their joint accomplishments, a situation that has been noted by others. Her son, Kerry Kornfeld, is also a scientist and while he was in high school, they jointly published a paper on lectins.

References 

Washington University in St. Louis faculty
George Washington University alumni
1935 births
2007 deaths
Women biochemists